Rob Sheppard is an American college baseball coach who has been the head coach at Seton Hall since the start of the 2004 season. Sheppard was also the Pirates' interim head coach in 2001. He succeeded his father, Mike, who had been Seton Hall's head coach since 1973. Under Sheppard, the Pirates have appeared in two NCAA Tournaments.

Playing career
Sheppard, a Seton Hall alumnus, played baseball at the school from 1989–1992.  He captained the team his senior season, and the Pirates appeared in the Big East Tournament in each of his four seasons. He was a career .278 hitter for the Pirates.

Coaching career
After graduating in 1992, Sheppard spent two years coaching American Legion and high school baseball before joining his father's staff at Seton Hall as an assistant in 1995. He held this position for six seasons.

In 2001, Sheppard served as interim head coach while his father missed the season due to heart surgery.  The Pirates went 14–11–1 in conference play to tie for third in the Big East, then went 4–0 at the Big East Tournament, defeating Virginia Tech in the championship game to earn the program's second straight NCAA Tournament berth.  At the Clemson Regional, the Pirates went 2–2, beating top-seeded South Alabama twice and losing to Clemson in the regional final.  Future Manhattan and Fordham head coach Kevin Leighton played for Sheppard on the 2001 team.

Mike Sheppard returned from 2002–2003, during which time Rob served as associate head coach.  His father resigned after the 2003 season, and Rob served as interim head coach in 2004 before being named to the position permanently ahead of the 2005 season.

Between 2004–2010, Seton Hall had only two winning seasons (2008 and 2009) and made only one Big East Tournament appearance (2008).  In 2011, however, the Pirates returned to the NCAA Tournament.  They went 4–0 at the Big East Tournament, defeating St. John's in the championship game to earn the conference's automatic bid to the NCAA Tournament. There, they went 1–2 at the College Station Regional.

From 2011–2014, Seton Hall had four straight 30-win seasons, including a high of 39 in 2014, its first year in the new Big East Conference.

Head coaching record
Below is a table of Sheppard's records as a collegiate head baseball coach.

Personal
Sheppard is the brother-in-law of St. John's head coach Ed Blankmeyer, who is married to his sister, Susan.

See also
 List of current NCAA Division I baseball coaches
 Seton Hall Pirates

References

Living people
Seton Hall Pirates baseball players
Seton Hall Pirates baseball coaches
High school baseball coaches in the United States
Year of birth missing (living people)